Matheus Oliveira Diniz (born April 18, 1993)  is a Brazilian submission wrestler and Brazilian jiu-jitsu (BJJ) black belt competitor. His most notable achievement is winning the 2019 ADCC World Championship in the Middleweight division as well as being a medalist at the IBJJF World Championships in both Gi and No-Gi formats.

Background

Diniz was born on the 8th of April, 1993 in Uberlândia, State of Minas Gerais, Brazil. At a young age he moved to Formiga.

When Diniz was 10, he started learning Capoeira. Being a troublemaker, Diniz got expelled from a school which put an end to his Capoeira classes.

At the age of 15 during high school, Diniz heard of a kid from a rival neighbourhood who disliked him and wanted to fight. Diniz knew the kid and the fact he trained BJJ at a local academy so Diniza went to the BJJ academy to settle the score with him.  Rodrigo Ranieri, the instructor at the academy did not allow the fight to take place and told Diniz that he would train together and become friends. Ranieri would become the first BJJ coach of Diniz.

After a few years of training and receiving his blue belt, Diniz moved to Poços de Caldas to train under Paulo Rezende who would award Diniz his purple and brown belts. During this time, Diniz became acquainted with Marcelo Garcia who saw great potential in Diniz. After Diniz received his Brown Belt, Garcia invited him to come to New York City to train at his academy.

At the Marcelo Garcia Academy, Diniz achieved significant success in major BJJ tournaments that brought Diniza a lot of media attention and fans.

In April 2015, Garcia promoted Diniz to Black Belt.

Grappling career

On September 16, 2018, Diniz faced Craig Jones at the main event of Grapplefest 2 that was held in Liverpool, UK. The match went to a decision after 20 minutes with Diniz winning by referee decision. The result was considered controversial as some believe Jones should have won the bout.

Diniz competed at the 2019 ADCC World Championship in the middleweight division. He defeated Pedro Marinho, Gabriel Arges and Josh Hinger to reach the finals. In the finals, he defeated Craig Jones by winning on points to become champion.

On June 26, 2021, Dinize faced Lucas Barbosa at the co-main event of BJJ Stars 6. The match was largely uneventful until the last 90 seconds. Towards the end Barbosa was ahead on points but Diniz managed to lock his arm underneath Barbosa's chin. When the bell rang signaling the end of the match, it was revealed Barbosa was unconscious from the choke. However, after a brief debate, it was determined Barbosa went unconscious after the bell and therefore won via points. The decision was considered controversial and attracted debate.

Championships and accomplishments

Brazilian jiu-jitsu / Submission wrestling 
List of achievements at black belt level:

 ADCC Submission Fighting World Champion (2019)
 IBJJF Pan-American No-Gi Champion (2015 absolute)
 Kasai Pro 185 lbs Grand Prix Champion (2018)
 2nd place IBJJF World No-Gi Championship (2015)
 2nd place IBJJF Pan-American Championship (2022)
 2nd place IBJJF Pan-American No-Gi Championship (2015)
 3rd place IBJJF World Championship (2019)
 3rd place IBJJF World No-Gi Championship (2015, 2016, 2017)
 3rd place IBJJF Pan-American Championship (2017, 2018)
List of achievements in lower belts divisions:

 IBJJF World No-Gi Champion (2013/2014 brown)
 IBJJF Pan-American Champion (2015 brown)
 2nd place IBJJF World Championship (2012 purple, 2014 brown)
 2nd place IBJJF Pan-American Championship (2015 brown absolute)

Instructor lineage 
Mitsuyo "Count Koma" Maeda → Carlos Gracie Sr. → Helio Gracie → Rolls Gracie → Romero "Jacare" Cavalcanti → Fabio Gurgel → Marcelo Garcia → Matheus Diniz

References

External links
 

1993 births
Living people
ADCC Submission Fighting World Champions (men)
Brazilian practitioners of Brazilian jiu-jitsu
Brazilian submission wrestlers
People awarded a black belt in Brazilian jiu-jitsu
People from Uberlândia
World Brazilian Jiu-Jitsu Championship medalists
World No-Gi Brazilian Jiu-Jitsu Championship medalists